Heavy Hearts is a Canadian alternative rock band from Niagara-on-the-Lake, ON, formed in 2013. The band has released three EPs and one studio album. Their sophomore album Room With a View was released on June 26, 2020.

History 
The four band members came together in 2013 in Niagara-on-the-Lake, ON. Vocalist and guitarist Justin Glatt has commented on how growing up in the small town inspired some of their earlier music. 

Heavy Hearts self-released their debut EP Jacoba in 2013. In 2015, they released their second EP entitled Somewhere, A While Ago. They signed to the label New Damage Records to release their third EP in March 2016, and in July 2016 Heavy Hearts released their first full-length album Bliss, released under New Damage Records. 

Heavy Hearts' sound is influenced by early 2000s emo punk as well as 90s alternative rock. The band has been described as "an emotional mixture of screams and singing" as well as "Taking Back Sunday all grown up and self-aware." They have also been compared to bands like Balance and Composure, Citizen and Turnover with their "unique and intense sound full of effects-laden guitars and emotive vocals."

They have played many shows with other Canadian alternative bands including Seaway, Coldfront, Rarity, Life in Vacuum, and Sparrows. In 2016, they accompanied Seaway on their Canadian Tour along with Coldfront and Rarity. In 2017, the band began their longest tour in the United States with American based bands Fossil Youth and Sleep In.

Heavy Hearts released their On A Chain EP on October 27, 2017 under New Damage Records and Failure by Design Records. It has been described as a confirmation "that they have grown musically and made a huge leap forward in the short sixteen months between releases." Following that release, the band embarked on a UK/EU tour with Lightcliffe.

In 2018, the band began work on their second full-length album. The first single, "Cut Too Deep", was released on September 12, 2018. In late 2019, the band parted ways with their previous label ahead of the second single, "Vexed".

Discography

Studio albums

Extended plays

Singles

Members 
 Current
 Justin Glatt - lead vocals, guitar
 Jamie Gorman - bass guitar
 Riley Jensen - lead guitar
 Joey Demers - drums, percussion, backing vocals

Past Members

 JJ Sorensen - Drums
Davis Maxwell - Drums, Percussion
 Connor Greenway - Drums, Percussion
 Shaun O'Melia - Guitar

References 
 Citations

External links 
Official Website
 Heavy Hearts at Bandcamp
Facebook
Twitter
Instagram

Musical groups established in 2013
Canadian punk rock groups
Canadian post-hardcore musical groups
Musical groups from the Regional Municipality of Niagara
2013 establishments in Ontario